A by-election was held in the United Kingdom parliamentary constituency of Stretford and Urmston on 15 December 2022, following the appointment of sitting Labour MP Kate Green as Deputy Mayor of Greater Manchester. Green was appointed as Steward and Bailiff of the Manor of Northstead on 10 November, giving effect to her resignation as a member of Parliament.

The by-election was won by Andrew Western, retaining the seat for Labour with an increased share of the vote. The turnout was 25.8%. This was the second by-election to be held during both the reign of King Charles III and the premiership of Rishi Sunak; it took place two weeks after a by-election in the City of Chester in nearby Cheshire. It was also the first by-election in Greater Manchester since the 2015 Oldham West and Royton by-election.

Background 

The Stretford and Urmston constituency covers a suburban industrial area in the Borough of Trafford in southern Greater Manchester. The constituency stretches from Manchester United's Old Trafford football ground and the cricket ground of the same name just outside Manchester city centre, to the south-west town of Partington. The Manchester Ship Canal forms the entire northern boundary of the seat. The population of the constituency is based around the seat's namesakes, the towns of Stretford and Urmston. Other areas include Davyhulme, Dumplington, Flixton, Gorse Hill and Wharfside. Major employers include the Shell works at Carrington and the Trafford Park industrial estate. Also in the constituency is the Trafford Centre shopping complex.

Stretford and Urmston was first fought at the 1997 general election, and has been represented by the Labour Party since its creation. The constituency was formed from large parts of the former constituency of Davyhulme, whose last member was the Conservative Winston Churchill.  Its first MP was Beverley Hughes, who stood down at the 2010 general election and Kate Green was then elected. On 6 May 2017, Hughes was appointed as Deputy Mayor for Policing and Crime by Greater Manchester Combined Authority Mayor Andy Burnham. Hughes resigned from the role in November 2022, with Green chosen to replace her, leading to the by-election.

Candidates 
The successful Labour Party candidate for the by-election was Andrew Western, who had been leader of Trafford Council since 2018.

The Conservative Party candidate was political consultant Emily Carter-Kandola.

The Liberal Democrats candidate was Anna Fryer, a senior mental health doctor at Trafford General Hospital.

The Green Party candidate was Dan Jerrome, a local Green councillor for Altrincham on Trafford Council.

The Reform UK candidate was Paul Swansborough, who previously stood as UKIP candidate in the 2017 general election in Redditch.

Result

Previous result

Reaction 
Labour achieved their highest vote share in the seat's history. The election turnout was reportedly affected by below freezing weather conditions and postal workers strikes. After the result, political scientist John Curtice said "Labour are now in a stronger position than they have been at any point since ... 2010."

References

External links 
 The Trafford Council website's page on the by-election
 Stretford and Urmston by-election – what, who, when, where, why?. The Messenger. Published 17 November 2022.

By-elections to the Parliament of the United Kingdom in Greater Manchester constituencies
Elections in Trafford
Stretford and Urmston
Politics of Greater Manchester
2022 elections in the United Kingdom
2022 in England
2020s in Greater Manchester